Marin Draganja and Nikola Mektić were the defending champions but only Nikola Mektić returned, partnering Goran Tošić, but lost in the first round to Dino Marcan and Antonio Šančić.

Dino Marcan and Antonio Šančić won the title, defeating Jaroslav Pospíšil and Adrian Sikora 7–5, 6–4 in the final.

Seeds

Draw

Draw

References
 Main Draw

Banja Luka Challenger - Doubles
2014 Doubles
2014 in Bosnia and Herzegovina